Adelaide Victory are a soccer club from Pennington, South Australia. Adelaide Victory play in the NPL State League. Their home ground is at Pennington Oval. Prior to 2015, the club was known as the Western Toros.

Club history
From 2011, The Western Toros will introduce the FFA National Curriculum beginning at Junior level. The focus will be on developing football intelligence, technique and game awareness through modified small sided games in training.

In August, 2011 The Western Toros U15 team reached the club's first FFSA Cup Final. The game was held at Hindmarsh Stadium against Adelaide City. The Toros came from behind to win the game 4–3 with a late powerful header from Jordan Murphy following a corner.

In 2012 Western District Toros had their first ever championship win in the senior men's competition, coached by Lou Ricciuto and John Heenan.

In 2015 Western Toros changed their club name to Adelaide Victory FC to incorporate the greater Adelaide community, and moved their home ground to Rushworth Reserve, Blair Athol.

In 2018 Adelaide Victory were Champions of the FFSA State League 2 division, and were promoted to State League 1 for 2019.

In 2020 - the Adelaide Victory Senior Women's team commenced.

Players

First team squad

References

External links
  Club Website

Soccer clubs in Adelaide
Association football clubs established in 2015
2015 establishments in Australia